The Young Jacobites is a 1960 British serial for the Children's Film Foundation.

Plot
Two children on holiday on the Isle of Skye, Scotland, go back in time and help Bonnie Prince Charlie escape from Scotland to France.

Cast
Francesca Annis as Jean
Jeremy Bulloch as Hamish
Frazer Hines as Angus

References

External links
Young Jacobites at IMDb
Young Jacobites at Letterbox DVD
Young Jacobites at BFI

1960 films
Children's Film Foundation
1960s British films